S. N. Balasubramanian was elected to the Tamil Nadu Legislative Assembly from the Bhavani constituency in the 1996 elections. He was a candidate of the Tamil Maanila Congress party.

References 

Tamil Nadu MLAs 1996–2001
Tamil Maanila Congress politicians
Year of birth missing
Possibly living people